The Return of Charlie Chan (also known as Happiness Is a Warm Clue) is a 1973 American television film. It was directed by Daryl Duke and stars Ross Martin, Richard Haydn, Louise Sorel, and Leslie Nielsen.

Plot
Charlie Chan investigates a murder case aboard the yacht of a wealthy Greek shipping tycoon.

Cast
 Ross Martin as Charlie Chan
 Richard Haydn as Andrew Kidder
 Louise Sorel as Ariane Hadrachi
 Joseph Hindy as Paul Hadrachi
 Kathleen Widdoes as Irene Hadrachi
 Don Gordon as Lambert
 Peter Donat as Noel Adamson
 Leslie Nielsen as Alexander Hadrachi

See also
 List of American films of 1973

External links

1973 television films
1973 films
Charlie Chan films
1970s crime films
ABC network original films
Films directed by Daryl Duke
Films scored by Robert Prince
1970s English-language films
1970s American films